Soile is a Finnish female given name.

Famous people
Soile Isokoski, singer
Soile Lautsi, who brought the case Laustsi v. Italy 
Soile Kalmari, football player
Soile Kaukovalta, writer 
Soile Lahdenperä, dancer
Soile Malm, football player
Soile Yli-Mäyry, artist

References

Finnish feminine given names